Dobson is a small town on the banks of the Grey River in the South Island of New Zealand. The settlement of Taylorville is across the river from Dobson, but no bridge directly connects the two. State Highway 7 passes through Dobson.

History
The town is named for the surveyor George Dobson, the second son of Edward Dobson and brother of Arthur Dudley Dobson, who was murdered at this site in 1866. He was killed in a bungled robbery by a gang who had mistaken him for a gold buyer carrying gold from the nearby Arnold goldfield. A monument now stands where George Dobson was murdered.

Dobson was the site of one of the West Coast's many coal mines. The Dobson mine was opened in 1919, and closed in 1968. It was the site of one of the country's worst mining disasters. Nine men were killed in an explosion at the mine in 1926.

A hydroelectric dam was proposed for the area by TrustPower in 1999 but it failed to secure access to public land that needed to be flooded for the scheme. In 2003 Nick Smith, who was an Opposition MP at the time, attempted to remove the reserve status from the land needed for the dam reservoir in order to allow the scheme to go ahead, but was unsuccessful.

Demographics
The population of Dobson town was 570 in the 2018 census, an increase of 3 from 2013. There were 312 males and 255 females. 93.2% of people identified as European/Pākehā, 12.6% as Māori and 2.6% as Asian. 16.3% were under 15 years old, 20.5% were 15–29, 43.2% were 30–64, and 19.5% were 65 or older.

The statistical area of Dobson, which at 170 square kilometres is much larger than the town, had a population of 828 at the 2018 New Zealand census, an increase of 27 people (3.4%) since the 2013 census, and an increase of 21 people (2.6%) since the 2006 census. There were 342 households. There were 459 males and 369 females, giving a sex ratio of 1.24 males per female. The median age was 44.6 years (compared with 37.4 years nationally), with 141 people (17.0%) aged under 15 years, 150 (18.1%) aged 15 to 29, 393 (47.5%) aged 30 to 64, and 147 (17.8%) aged 65 or older.

Ethnicities were 93.5% European/Pākehā, 11.6% Māori, 0.4% Pacific peoples, 2.5% Asian, and 1.8% other ethnicities (totals add to more than 100% since people could identify with multiple ethnicities).

The proportion of people born overseas was 6.2%, compared with 27.1% nationally.

Although some people objected to giving their religion, 58.0% had no religion, 26.1% were Christian, 0.4% were Hindu and 2.9% had other religions.

Of those at least 15 years old, 45 (6.6%) people had a bachelor or higher degree, and 222 (32.3%) people had no formal qualifications. The median income was $27,800, compared with $31,800 nationally. The employment status of those at least 15 was that 360 (52.4%) people were employed full-time, 93 (13.5%) were part-time, and 36 (5.2%) were unemployed.

Education
Paparoa Range School is a coeducational full primary (years 1–8) school with a decile rating of 3 and a roll of  students as of  The school was established in 2005 when Blackball, Kaiata, Stillwater and Brunnerton Primary Schools were merged onto the Brunnerton Primary School site.

References

External links
History of West Coast coal mining

Grey District
Populated places in the West Coast, New Zealand